Philip M. Hine is a British occultist and writer. He became known internationally through his written works Condensed Chaos, Prime Chaos, and Pseudonomicon, as well as several essays on the topics of chaos magic and Cthulhu Mythos magic. He has facilitated workshops and seminars on modern magical practice in America and Europe and contributed to a wide range of occult journals, having been most active from 1986 to 1996.

Early life
Growing up in Blackpool, Hine became involved with chaos magic theory in West Yorkshire in the 1980s. This was after he "picked up the fabled white edition of Liber Null by Peter J. Carroll" at Sorcerer's Apprentice bookshop.

Career
Hine was a founder and co-editor of occult magazine Pagan News in partnership with Rodney Orpheus. Hine subsequently published a series of booklets on urban shamanism in the late 1980s. 

His earliest popular work was a small pamphlet which outlined a brief and simple definition of magic, a brief history of the school of practice called chaos magic, and an outline of some of its basic approaches, which presented a number of simple techniques. This was followed in 1993 by Prime Chaos, which focused on the construction and uses of more formalised ritual techniques

In 1995, he expanded his earlier pamphlet under the same title, Condensed Chaos. This book focuses on the basic techniques and the style of doing magic that has become associated with chaos magic. It has been described by William S. Burroughs as "the most concise statement of the logic of modern magic".

Views
Hine finds that the definition of "black magic" has been convoluted by people who define practices that they disapprove of as "black magic".

Personal life
As of 1997 he resides in South London.

Hine is bisexual.

Bibliography

Books

As editor

Contributions

Articles

References

External links

Year of birth missing (living people)
Living people
Bisexual men
British bisexual writers
Chaos magicians
English male non-fiction writers
English occult writers
English LGBT writers